K. Kunhiraman (born 10 November 1943) is a politician from Kasaragod, Kerala, India. He is the present MLA (Member of Legislative Assembly) representing Trikaripur constituency. He is a Member, State Committee of Communist Party of India (Marxist) (CPI(M)). He holds diploma in Ayurvedic medicine, he is an ayurvedic doctor.

References

External links
K. Kunhiraman MLA

1943 births
Living people
Communist Party of India (Marxist) politicians from Kerala
People from Kasaragod district
Kerala MLAs 2016–2021
Kerala MLAs 2006–2011
Kerala MLAs 2011–2016